Josip "Jozo" Tomasevich (March 16, 1908 – October 15, 1994) was an American economist and military historian. He was professor emeritus at San Francisco State University.

Education and career
Tomašević was born in the village of Košarni Do on the Pelješac peninsula, Dalmatia, Austria-Hungary (today part of Orebić municipality, Croatia). He completed his secondary education in Sarajevo before moving to Switzerland to study at the University of Basel, from where he graduated with a Ph.D. in economics in 1932. After graduation, he worked as financial expert at the Yugoslav National Bank in Belgrade until 1938 when he moved to the United States with a Rockefeller fellowship, "availing himself of the rich resources of Harvard University".

In the United States, he first worked at the Food Research Institute of Stanford University as a member of their scholarly staff. During World War II he was affiliated with the Board of Economic Warfare and the United Nations Relief and Rehabilitation Administration in Washington, D.C. After the war he first worked at the Federal Reserve Bank in San Francisco. In 1948 he joined the San Francisco State University and he taught there for twenty-five years until he retired in 1973. He taught for a year at Columbia University around 1954.

In 1974 and 1976 he received fellowships for his "Postdoctoral Research in East European Studies" from the American Council of Learned Societies.

Work 
Before 1938, Tomasevich's publications focused on the finances of the Kingdom of Yugoslavia during the Great Depression. In the US, he first focused on the economic aspects of the international relations in the Pacific basin. He followed that with a study of the "economic problems of the Yugoslav peasantry within a larger social, political and historical framework" in his 1955 book Peasants, Politics, and Economic Change in Yugoslavia.

In the late 1950s he started to work on a planned trilogy of the history of Yugoslavia during World War II. The first volume, focused on the Chetniks, appeared in 1975 and it was "basically a study in politics, ideology and military operations, although the role of the economic factor has not been overlooked". The second volume concentrated on collaboration and the quisling governments in Yugoslavia, especially the Independent State of Croatia, and was published posthumously in 2001 with editing from his daughter Neda. The third volume, which covered the Yugoslav Partisans, is 75 percent complete and remains unpublished.

In October 2001, Tomasevich's personal library was donated to the Stanford University Libraries.

Recognition
In 1989, Tomasevich and Wayne S. Vucinich received the Distinguished Contributions to Slavic Studies Award from the Association for Slavic, East European, and Eurasian Studies.

Personal life
In 1937 Tomasevich married Neda Brelić, a high-school teacher, with whom he had three children. She died on July 5, 2002 at the age of 88.

Selected bibliography

References

External links

1908 births
1994 deaths
People from Orebić
People from the Kingdom of Dalmatia
20th-century American economists
Yugoslav emigrants to the United States
Yugoslav expatriates in Switzerland
Historians of the Balkans
American military historians
American male non-fiction writers
San Francisco State University faculty
Columbia University faculty
University of Basel alumni
Rockefeller Fellows
20th-century American historians
Historians of World War II